Aberranta is a genus of polychaete thought to be related to the Nerillidae.

References 

Protostome enigmatic taxa
Polychaete genera